Tremors: A Cold Day in Hell (also known as Tremors 6: A Cold Day in Hell) is a 2018 direct-to-video monster film directed by Don Michael Paul. It is the sixth film in the Tremors series of monster films. The film was released on DVD and Blu-ray, as well as on Netflix on May 1, 2018.

Plot
In Canada's Nunavut Territory, a team of young researchers collecting ice core samples of glaciers are killed by a Graboid. After brushing off a tax agent, Burt Gummer and his son Travis Welker are asked by Dr. Rita Sims and young Graboid hunter Valerie McKee to investigate. Their plane is attacked by an Ass-Blaster, but Burt and Travis make it to the facility. They learn that Arctic heat conditions have made the area prime for Graboids. Burt suspects their research neighbors at DARPA are developing bio-weapons out of the Graboids. When an Ass-Blaster attacks the facility, Burt rescues a researcher but experiences an episode and collapses. He learns that he has been infected by a parasite based on Graboid venom, from when he was inside one years earlier, and that they need to extract the antibodies from a live one to save him.

As Graboids continue to kill off researchers and staff, several members of the group try to make their way from the lab to the generator area where the pilot Mac is repairing the plane, and the facilities manager Swackhamer has created a makeshift underground electric fence. Others head for the communications tower and to turn off a drill that has automatically activated. With his own research team attacked, Agent Cutts of DARPA joins Burt's group, revealing that his team was more interested in extracting the melted water and not fashioning bio-weapons. He agrees to Burt and Travis' conditions that the government remove the tax liens from their place in Perfection and exempt them from paying property taxes henceforth. The group eventually use a storage container to trap one of the Graboids, spearing it from the side to hold it in place, and cutting off its front tentacles. Travis reaches in the graboid's mouth with a syringe and draws venom from its internal gland sac, which is then used to save Burt. Cutts gives the Gummers the paperwork freeing them from taxes, then they blow up the last Graboid before Cutts gets any ideas of really using it as a bio-weapon.

Cast

 Michael Gross as Burt Gummer, the only resident left in the apparently abandoned and demolished Perfection, Nevada. Burt resides in and runs Chang's Market which appears to be all that is left of the town.
 Jamie Kennedy as Travis B. Welker, Burt's son who works as a filmmaker.

 Tanya van Graan as Dr. Rita Sims, the lead researcher at Boite Canyon Arctic Research Facility
 Jamie-Lee Money as Valerie McKee, a Graboid expert, and a student intern at the facility. She is the daughter of Valentine McKee and Rhonda LeBeck, lead characters from the first Tremors film.
 Kiroshan Naidoo as Hart Hansen, a researcher in geomorphology
 Keeno Lee Hector as Aklark, Valerie and Rita's assistant, a local to the area
 Rob van Vuuren as Swackhamer, facility manager
 Adrienne Pearce as Mac, the pilot who flew Burt and Travis in
 Francesco Nassimbeni as Dr. Charles Ferezze, a cowardly researcher who wants to get out of the area by any means possible
 Paul du Toit as Mr. Cutts, a DARPA agent in charge of the neighboring facility
 Christie Peruso as Geo-Tech Vargas, a researcher
 Jay Anstey as Dr. D, a researcher

Production
On September 20, 2016, Michael Gross announced on his official Facebook page that the film was in development. Filming commenced in late January 2017.

The crew had originally intended to shoot in the mountains of Bulgaria, but after the country had endured one of its largest blizzards, they opted to return to South Africa, where Tremors 5: Bloodlines was filmed. The opening scene was filmed in the desert, made to look like snow with filters and video processing techniques. The nice weather was explained by climate change causing unusual warmth in the Arctic. The crew used CGI for many of the Graboid scenes.

Reception 
Tremors: A Cold Day in Hell received mixed reviews.  Tim Janson of The SciFi Movie Page gave the film two stars out of five, saying "While none of the Tremors sequels (nor the one prequel) have ever been able to hold a candle to the original, A Cold Day in Hell is definitely one to miss. This sleep-inducing bore fest cannot even be saved by Burt’s over-the-top arrogance and crankiness." Gavin Al-Asif for the Houston Chronicle called the film "so bad it's nearly unwatchable" and said the film felt as if it were "made by people who absolutely loathe Tremors and want to insult the fans as much as possible". Conversely, Fred Topel of Bloody Disgusting gave the film a more positive review of 3.5 out of 5, noting that that arctic setting was "... a fun change of setting without compromising the monster attacks."  He also praised the performances of the cast, especially Gross and Money.

It earned $1,530,564 from domestic home video sales.

Sequel 

A sequel, Tremors: Shrieker Island, was released on October 20, 2020, with Michael Gross reprising his role as Burt.

References

External links
 

2018 films
2018 direct-to-video films
2010s monster movies
Tremors (franchise)
Universal Pictures direct-to-video films
Direct-to-video action films
Direct-to-video science fiction films
Direct-to-video sequel films
Films set in Nunavut
Films set in the Arctic
Films shot in South Africa
Films directed by Don Michael Paul
Films scored by Frederik Wiedmann
American monster movies
South African horror films
English-language South African films
2010s English-language films
2010s American films